Walce  German: Walzen, is a village in Krapkowice County, Opole Voivodeship, in south-western Poland. It is the seat of the gmina (administrative district) called Gmina Walce.

The village has a population of 2,100.

References

Walce